Armand Marquiset, French philanthropist, humanitarian and nobleman, was born on September 29, 1900, in the château of Montguichet near Paris
and died on July 14, 1981, in Burtonport, Ireland.

He founded several non-profit organizations, for example 
Les petits frères des Pauvres (1946), a large French charity that takes care of elderly people,
and Frères des Hommes (1965).

External links 
 https://web.archive.org/web/20120911061727/http://www.petitsfreres.asso.fr/qui-sommes-nous-/l-histoire.html Brief history of les petits frères des Pauvres (in French)
 https://web.archive.org/web/20131012060438/http://www.petitsfreres.asso.fr/index.php?rub=7746&lang=FR&view=afficher_article_complet&textes=12238l Biography of Armand Marquiset (in French)

French philanthropists
1900 births
1981 deaths
20th-century philanthropists